Filippo Paladino  (1544 -1614) was an Italian painter.

Biography
He was born near Florence in Tuscany and remained there until circa 1586 when he was imprisoned and subsequently exiled to Malta. From there, he moved to Sicily where he was active the rest of his life. He painted an altarpiece for the church of Sant'Ignazio all'Olivella. He painted two altarpieces for the church of San Gregorio Magno, Vizzini. He painted two altarpieces for the church of San Giorgio dei Genovesi, Palermo.

References

 

1544 births
1614 deaths
Painters from Florence
Painters from Sicily
16th-century Italian painters
17th-century Italian painters
Italian male painters